Francis John Henry Jenkinson (20 August 1853 – 21 September 1923) was librarian of the University of Cambridge 1889–1923. He was succeeded by A. F. Scholfield.

Life
Jenkinson was born in the town of Forres, Moray in Scotland. He was educated at Marlborough College, and matriculated in 1872 at Trinity College, Cambridge, where in 1876 he gained a B.A. with a first class din the Classical Tripos; he graduate M.A. in 1879. In 1878 he became a Fellow of Trinity fellow, lecturing in Classics between 1881 and 1889. Jenkinson married Marian Sydney Wetton in 1887.

Whilst librarian at Cambridge, Jenkinson oversaw the acquisition of various collections, including Lord Acton's library and material from the Cairo Genizah. During World War I he began what is known as the War Reserve Collection, which includes unofficial and personal items and ephemera such as flyers, cards and journals as well as public school rolls of honour and weekly casualty lists.  He made a public appeal for donations to the collection, following which donations were received from members of the armed forces, personal contacts, and members of the public.

Jenkinson received the honorary degree Doctor of Letters (D.Litt.) from the University of Oxford in October 1902, in connection with the tercentenary of the Bodleian Library.

References 

Cambridge University Librarians
1853 births
1923 deaths
Scottish librarians
Alumni of Trinity College, Cambridge
Fellows of Trinity College, Cambridge
Scottish people of English descent
Scottish bibliographers
People from Forres